The First is a musical with a book by critic Joel Siegel.  The music was composed by Robert Brush, and Martin Charnin wrote the lyrics.  The show is based on the life of Brooklyn Dodgers second baseman Jackie Robinson, the first African-American to play major league baseball in the 20th century.

The musical premiered on Broadway at the Martin Beck Theatre on November 17, 1981 and closed on December 12, 1981 after 31 performances and 33 previews (although often erroneously reported as having 37 performances). Charnin has said that despite "stellar reviews," the musical failed to secure one: that of Frank Rich of The New York Times, "which at the time meant everything." Directed by Charnin and choreographed by Alan Johnson, the original cast included David Alan Grier as Jackie Robinson, and Lonette McKee as his wife Rachel.

Songs

Act I
 Jack Roosevelt Robinson	
 The National Pastime	
 Will We Ever Know Each Other
 The First		 
 Bloat	 		 
 It Ain't Gonna Work	 
 The Brooklyn Dodger Strike
 Jack Roosevelt Robinson (Reprise)
 The First (Reprise)	 

Act 2	 		 
 Is This Year Next Year?  
 You Do-Do-Do-It Good 
 Is This Year Next Year? (Reprise)	
 There Are Days and There Are Days	
 It's A Beginning	 
 The Opera Ain't Over

Awards and nominations

Original Broadway production

References

External links

1981 musicals
Broadway musicals
Biographical musicals
Cultural depictions of Jackie Robinson